"Reencarnación" (Reincarnation) is a song by Thalía, released as the fourth single from her album Arrasando.
It was a hit single throughout Latin America. Its music video was also a hit.
To promote the song she appeared in various TV shows to sing the song. Reencarnacion is a powerful Latin dance song.

History
Reencarnación talks about a love that lasts through eternity. She states that even though she and her love keep meeting through various lifetimes, she doesn't want to fall in love again. The song features middle eastern samples. Lyrics was written by Thalía.

Video
Reencarnación was directed by: Emilio Estefan Jr

Single
 Reencarnación (Radio Edit) - 3:53

Charts

References

External links
 Reencarnación (Music Video) - Watch

Thalía songs
Songs written by Draco Rosa
2001 singles
Spanish-language songs
EMI Latin singles
Songs written by Thalía
2000 songs
Song recordings produced by Emilio Estefan